The following outline is provided as an overview of and topical guide to ecology:

Ecology – scientific study of the distribution and abundance of living organisms and how the distribution and abundance are affected by interactions between the organisms and their environment.  The environment of an organism includes both physical properties, which can be described as the sum of local abiotic factors such as solar insolation, climate and geology, as well as the other organisms that share its habitat.  Also called ecological science.

 evolution of human and species..

Essence of ecology
 , or 
 , or 
 , or

Other criteria
Ecology can also be classified on the basis of:

 the primary kinds of organism under study, e.g. animal ecology, plant ecology, insect ecology;
 the biomes principally studied, e.g. forest ecology, grassland ecology, desert ecology, benthic ecology, marine ecology, urban ecology;
 the geographic or climatic area, e.g. arctic ecology, tropical ecology;
 the spatial scale under consideration, e.g. macroecology, landscape ecology;
 the philosophical approach, e.g. systems ecology which adopts a holistic approach;
 the methods used, e.g. molecular ecology.

Subdisciplines of ecology, and subdiscipline classification
Ecology is a broad discipline comprising many subdisciplines. The field of ecology can be subdivided according to several classification schemes:

By methodology used for investigation
  –
  –
  – the development of ecological theory, usually with mathematical, statistical and/or computer modeling tools.

By spatial scale of ecological system under study
  –
  –
 .

By level of organisation or scope
Arranged from lowest to highest level of organisation:
  – the study of individual organisms of a single species in relation to their environment;
  – the study of homogenous or heterogenous groups of organisms in relation to their environment;
  – the study of homogenous groups of organisms related as a single species;
  – the study of heterogenous groups of organisms of multiple associated species;
 .

By biological classification or taxon under study
  –
  –
  –
  –
 .

By biome under study
  –
  –
  –
  –
  –
  –
 .

By biogeographic realm or climatic area under study
  –
  –
 .

By ecological aspects or phenomena under investigation
  –
  – which deals with the ecological role of biological chemicals used in a wide range of areas including defense against predators and attraction of mates;
  – which studies host-pathogen interactions, particularly those of infectious diseases, within the context of environmental factors;
  – which studies the interaction of physiological traits with the abiotic environment;
  – which looks at the ecological role of toxic chemicals (often pollutants, but also naturally occurring compounds);
  – or ecoevolution which looks at evolutionary changes in the context of the populations and communities in which the organisms exist;
  – which looks at the role of fire in the environment of plants and animals and its effect on ecological communities;
  – the study of the roles, or functions, that certain species (or groups thereof) play in an ecosystem;
  –
  –
  –
  –
  –
  –
  – the ecology of the pedosphere –
  –
  – the study of the relationship between temperature and organisms.

Ecology-involved interdisciplinary fields
  –
  – the practice of employing ecological principles and understanding to solve real world problems (includes agroecology and conservation biology);
  – which studies how to reduce the risk of species extinction;
  – which attempts to understand the ecological basis needed to restore impaired or damaged ecosystems;
  –
  –
  –
  –
  –
  –
  –
  –
  –
  –
  –
  –

Other disciplines
Ecology has also inspired (and lent its name to) other non-biological disciplines such as:
 Media ecology
 Industrial ecology
 Information ecology

Biogeographic regions

Terrestrial realms

. The World Wildlife Fund (WWF) developed a system of eight biogeographic realms (ecozones):
  22.9 mil. km² (including most of North America)
  54.1 mil. km² (including the bulk of Eurasia and North Africa)
  22.1 mil. km² (including Sub-Saharan Africa)
  7.5 mil. km² (including the South Asian subcontinent and Southeast Asia)
  7.7 mil. km² (including Australia, New Guinea, and neighbouring islands).  The northern boundary of this zone is known as the Wallace line.
  19.0 mil. km² (including South America and the Caribbean)
  1.0 mil. km² (including Polynesia, Fiji and Micronesia)
  0.3 mil. km² (including Antarctica).

Ecoregions

The World has over 800 terrestrial ecoregions.  See Lists of ecoregions by country.

History of ecology

 History of human ecology

General ecology concepts
 
 
 
 
 
 
 
 
 
 
 
 
 
 
 
 
 
 
 
 
 
 
 
 
 
 
 
 
 
 
 Niche differentiation – The process by which competing species use the environment differently in a way that helps them to coexist.

 Coexistence theory – A framework to understand and explain how ecologically similar species can coexist without competitively excluding each other

See also

References

External links

 What is Ecology?
 Fundamentals of Ecology Textbook-style investigation to the economy of nature, breaks down in four chapters from Population to Ecosystem.
 Ecology (Stanford Encyclopedia of Philosophy)

Ecology
Ecology